Curuçá River may refer to:

 Curuçá River (Javari River), a river in the state of Amazonas, Brazil
 Curuçá River (Pará), a river in the state of Pará, Brazil